After Tupac And D Foster (2008) is a novel written by Jacqueline Woodson. Set within a community affected by the life of Tupac Shakur, the novel follows three young girls as they group up in that community. The novel received a Newbery Medal Honor in 2009 and won the American Library Association Award and the 2009 Josette Frank Award.

Plot summary
After Tupac And D Foster is based on three girls: two black eleven year old girls, Neeka and the anonymous narrator, and D Foster, who was of mixed race and had just moved into Neeka and the narrator's neighborhood in Queens, New York. Their experiences are set within a world impacted by Tupac Shakur, describing events and experiences in his life during the mid 1990s, such as run-ins with the cops and events that foreshadowed his death.

Growing up together on the same block of their safe neighborhood, Neeka and the narrator have been friends since birth. When D. Foster first showed up on their block, her initial impression as unconventional and different had left the two girls in a bit of shock, as well as their mothers hesitant to let them interact with her. However, they then discovered that they both were greatly influenced by Tupac Shakur's music which caused the three girls to gradually  develop a lasting friendship. 

Later in their teens, Foster opens up to her two close friends about her alcoholic mother who had abandoned her as a child, leaving her in the care of constantly changing foster homes. She also shares with them the news of her biological Mother now wanting her back. However, relating her relationship with her Mother to that of Tupac's and his Mother, Foster realizes that even through the conflicting relationship, there is still love.

Characters
 Narrator - The main character, and unnamed 12 year old girl who tells the story.
 Neeka - Also the main character, was the narrators childhood friend.
 D Foster - Friend of Neeka and the Narrators. She moves to the city in the summer with her foster mother.
 Flo - Short for D's Foster Mom.
 Tash - Neeka's gay brother who's in prison. He is also referred to as "The Queen" or "Sissy".
 Ms. Irene - Neeka's Mom
 Jay (Jackson) Jones - Neeka's older brother who plays ball for Grady high school and works at KFC.

Awards
Newbery Medal
Josette Frank Award
American Library Association Award

References

2008 American novels
Newbery Honor-winning works
African-American young adult novels
Novels set in New York City
2008 children's books
Novels by Jacqueline Woodson